Pierre-Hector Coullié (14 March 1829 – 12 September 1912) was a Cardinal of the Roman Catholic Church and was Archbishop of Lyon.

Early life and priesthood
Pierre-Hector Coullié was born in Paris, France. He was educated at the Saint-Sulpice Seminary, Paris.

He was ordained on 23 December 1854. After his ordination he served in the Archdiocese of Paris as professor of its minor seminary; vicar at Ste-Marguerite, St-Eustache, and Notre Dame des Victoires churches from 1854 until 1876.

Episcopate 
He was appointed as titular bishop of Sidonia and appointed coadjutor bishop of Orléans on 29 September 1876. He succeeded to the see of Orléans on 11 October 1878. He was promoted to the metropolitan see of Lyon on 15 June 1893.

Cardinalate 
He was created Cardinal-Priest in the consistory of April 19, 1897; received red hat and title of SS. Trinità al Monte Pincio, March 24, 1898. Participated in the conclave of 1903.

Death. September 12, 1912, Lyon. Exposed and buried in the metropolitan cathedral of Lyon.

References

1829 births
1912 deaths
Seminary of Saint-Sulpice (France) alumni
19th-century French cardinals
Archbishops of Lyon
Bishops of Orléans
20th-century French cardinals
Burials at Lyon Cathedral
Cardinals created by Pope Leo XIII